Au Coin des Bons Enfants is a restaurant in Maastricht, Netherlands. It is a fine dining restaurant that was awarded one Michelin star in the period 1958–1970 and 2006–2012. GaultMillau awarded the restaurant 15.0 out of 20 points.

The first head chef was Theo Koch. In 1995, George Taselaar took over the restaurant and became head chef.

The restaurant is located in a former orphanage, originally built in 1750.

See also
 List of Michelin starred restaurants in the Netherlands

References

External links
 

Rijksmonuments in Maastricht
Restaurants in Maastricht
Restaurants in the Netherlands
Michelin Guide starred restaurants in the Netherlands
Restaurants established in 1949